The 2019 season is Sandefjord's first season back in the OBOS-ligaen following their relegation from the Eliteserien in 2018.

Current squad 
As of 20 February 2019.

 

For season transfers, see transfers winter 2018–19 and transfers summer 2019.

Players out on loan

Transfers

Winter

In:

Out:

Summer

In:

Out:

Friendlies

1. divisjon

Results summary

Matches

NM Cupen

References 

2019
Sandefjord